KWYX (93.5 FM) is a radio station licensed to Casper, Wyoming, United States. The station is currently owned by Cochise Broadcasting LLC.

References

External links

Country radio stations in the United States
WYX
Radio stations established in 2009